John Moore is a bluegrass musician who plays mandolin with the bands Bluegrass Etc. and California.

External links
John Moore website
Bluegrass Etc. website
California band website 

American bluegrass musicians
Year of birth missing (living people)
Living people
Place of birth missing (living people)
American bluegrass mandolinists